Uli Maslo (born 6 July 1938) is a German retired football player and manager.

Career
Maslo joined Tweede Divisie club RCH Heemstede from Rot-Weiss Essen in 1962 and played for the club till 1968.

References

External links
 

1938 births
Living people
Sportspeople from Bochum
Footballers from North Rhine-Westphalia
Association football midfielders
German footballers
SG Wattenscheid 09 players
Rot-Weiss Essen players
Racing Club Heemstede players
German expatriate footballers
Expatriate footballers in the Netherlands
German expatriate sportspeople in the Netherlands
German football managers
FC Schalke 04 managers
Borussia Dortmund managers
Eintracht Braunschweig managers
Riffa SC managers
Qatar SC managers
Qatar national football team managers
FC St. Pauli managers
Fortuna Düsseldorf managers
Al-Ta'ee managers
Bundesliga managers
2. Bundesliga managers
Saudi Professional League managers
German expatriate football managers
Expatriate football managers in Bahrain
Expatriate football managers in Saudi Arabia
Expatriate football managers in Qatar
German expatriate sportspeople in Saudi Arabia
German expatriate sportspeople in Qatar
German expatriate sportspeople in Bahrain